An off-season South Pacific tropical cyclone is a tropical cyclone that exists in the South Pacific basin outside of the official tropical cyclone season. The World Meteorological Organization currently defines the season as occurring between November 1 and April 30, of the following year, with approximately 96% of all activity occurring between these months. If a tropical cyclone should develop during the off-season, it is more likely to develop during May or October than any other month of the off-season. As of 2018, there have been 91 tropical cyclones known to have occurred off-season, with 54 of these occurring since the satellite era started during the 1969–70 season.

Off-season cyclones are most likely to occur in the Coral Sea, with most impacting either the Solomon Islands, Vanuatu and New Caledonia. The most recent off-season storm is Tropical Depression 01F, which developed during September 2018 and impacted the Solomon Islands. The deadliest and most damaging system was Severe Tropical Cyclone Namu, which caused over 100 deaths, when it impacted the Solomon Islands during May 1986.

Background

Tropical cyclones are considered to be non-frontal, low pressure systems that develop, within an environment of warm sea surface temperatures and little vertical wind shear aloft.

Within the South Pacific basin to the east of 160°E, the cyclone season is defined as running between November 1 and April 30 of the following year. During the off-season a total of 91 tropical cyclones have been recorded during the off-season, with a total of 54 of these systems occurring after satellite imagery became regularly available during the 1969–70 season.

The first system to exist in the off-season on record was active during May 17, 1868 and was located near Vanuatu, according to records compiled by Stephen Sargent Visher. The most recent systems to exist in the off-season were Severe Tropical Cyclone Donna and Tropical Cyclone Ella, which both developed during May 2017. The strongest tropical cyclone to exist during the off-season in terms of wind speed was Severe Tropical Cyclone Donna of 2017, with maximum 10–minute sustained winds of 125 mph (205 km/h), while the most intense by central pressure was Severe Tropical Cyclone Xavier of 2006, with a minimum value of 930 hPa (27.46 inHg). The deadliest and most damaging system was Severe Tropical Cyclone Namu, which caused over 100 deaths, when it impacted the Solomon Islands during May 1986.

Of the 57 known tropical systems that have been recorded during the off-season, a total of 33 tropical cyclones have been recorded in May or have persisted into the off-season after developing in April. A total of 18 tropical cyclones have developed during October, while three systems have been recorded in both June and July, while two have been recorded in September. The three systems recorded in June were all named tropical cyclones, with Gina and Keli considered to be a Category 3 severe tropical cyclones on the Australian tropical cyclone intensity scale. In addition Tropical Cyclone Raquel developed in June 2015 and was considered, to be the latest system to develop in the South Pacific Ocean. In addition as the system persisted into July 2015, it was unofficially considered to be a part of two tropical cyclone years. Off the two systems recorded in July, Tropical Depression 17F in July 2002 was designated 17F, despite being the first system of the 2002–03 season. Tropical Depression 01F/01P of July 2015, which subsequently persisted into August 2015. The first system that developed during September, was an unnamed system that occurred in 1924, which according to a report published by Greenpeace, caused damage to some ships to the west of New Caledonia. The other system was declared to be a tropical depression by the Fiji Meteorological Service during September 1999, but was more likely to be a hybrid system rather than a proper tropical depression.

The season with the most off-season systems was 1999–2000, which had a total of six tropical depressions existing during the off-season. The 1997–98, 2004–05 and 2013–14 seasons had four tropical cyclones during the off-season each, while the 1988–89 and the 1996–97 season had three off-season tropical cyclones.

Systems
The wind speeds listed are maximum ten-minute average sustained winds, while the pressure is the minimum barometric pressure, both of which are estimates taken from the archives of either the Australian Bureau of Meteorology, the Fiji Meteorological Service, and New Zealand's MetService. If there are no known estimates of either the winds or pressure then the system is listed as "Not specified" under winds or pressure, if there is no known estimated winds or pressure. For deaths and damages "None" indicates that there were no reports of fatalities or damages, although such storms may have impacted land. Where it The damage totals are the United States dollar of the year of the storm.

|-
| Unnamed ||  || bgcolor=#| || bgcolor=#| || bcolor=#| || Norfolk Island || None || None ||
|-
| Unnamed ||  || bgcolor=#| || bgcolor=#| || bgcolor=#| || Unknown || None || None ||
|-
| Unnamed ||  || bgcolor=#| || bgcolor=#| || bgcolor=#| || Unknown || None || None ||
|-
| Unnamed ||  || bgcolor=#| || bgcolor=#| || bgcolor=#| || New Caledonia || None || None ||
|-
| Unnamed ||  || bgcolor=#| || bgcolor=#| || bgcolor=#| || French Polynesia || None || None ||
|-
| Unnamed ||  || bgcolor=#| || bgcolor=#| || bgcolor=#| || Queensland, New Zealand || None || None ||
|-
| Unnamed ||  || bgcolor=#| || bgcolor=#| || bgcolor=#| || New Caledonia || None || None ||
|-
| Unnamed ||  || bgcolor=#| || bgcolor=#| || bgcolor=#| || New Zealand || None || None ||
|-
| Unnamed ||  || bgcolor=#| || bgcolor=#| || bgcolor=#| || New Zealand || None || None ||
|-
| Unnamed ||  || bgcolor=#| || bgcolor=#| || bgcolor=#| || Unknown || None || None ||
|-
| Unnamed ||  || bgcolor=#| || bgcolor=#| || bgcolor=#| || Unknown || None || None ||
|-
| Unnamed ||  || bgcolor=#| || bgcolor=#| || bgcolor=#| || Queensland, New Zealand || None || None ||
|-
| Unnamed ||  || bgcolor=#| || bgcolor=#| || bgcolor=#| || Queensland, New Zealand || None || None ||
|-
| Unnamed ||  || bgcolor=#| || bgcolor=#| || bgcolor=#| || Unknown || None || None ||
|-
| Unnamed ||  || bgcolor=#| || bgcolor=#| || bgcolor=#| || Queensland || None || None ||
|-
| Unnamed ||  || bgcolor=#| || bgcolor=#| || bgcolor=#| || Queensland || None || None ||
|-
| Unnamed ||  || bgcolor=#| || bgcolor=#| || bgcolor=#| || Queensland || None || None ||
|-
| Unnamed ||  || bgcolor=#| || bgcolor=#| || bgcolor=#| || Fiji || Minor || None ||
|-
| Unnamed ||  || bgcolor=#| || bgcolor=#| || bgcolor=#| || Queensland || None || None ||
|-
| Unnamed ||  || bgcolor=#| || bgcolor=#| || bgcolor=#| || Queensland || None || None ||
|-
| Unnamed ||  || bgcolor=#| || bgcolor=#| || bgcolor=#| || Queensland || None || None ||
|-
| Unnamed ||  || bgcolor=#| || bgcolor=#| || bgcolor=#| || None || None || None ||
|-
| Unnamed ||  || bgcolor=#| || bgcolor=#| || bgcolor=#| || Queensland || None || None ||
|-
| Unnamed ||  || bgcolor=#| || bgcolor=#| || bgcolor=#| || None || None || None ||
|-
| Unnamed ||  || bgcolor=#| || bgcolor=#| || bgcolor=#| || None || None || None ||
|-
| Unnamed ||  || bgcolor=#| || bgcolor=#| || bgcolor=#| || None || None || None ||
|-
| Unnamed ||  || bgcolor=#| || bgcolor=#| || bgcolor=#| || New Caledonia || None || None ||
|-
| Unnamed ||  || bgcolor=#| || bgcolor=#| || bgcolor=#| || None || None || None ||
|-
| Unnamed ||  || bgcolor=#| || bgcolor=#| || bgcolor=#| || Solomon Islands, New CaledoniaNew Zealand || None || None ||
|-
| Unnamed ||  || bgcolor=#| || bgcolor=#| || bgcolor=#| || Queensland || None || None ||
|-
| Unnamed ||  || bgcolor=#| || bgcolor=#| || bgcolor=#| || Queensland || None || None ||
|-
| Unnamed ||  || bgcolor=#| || bgcolor=#| || bgcolor=#| || Solomon Islands, Queensland || None || None ||
|-
| Unnamed ||  || bgcolor=#| || bgcolor=#| || bgcolor=#| || Solomon Islands, VanuatuNew Caledonia || None || None ||
|-
| Unnamed ||  || bgcolor=#| || bgcolor=#| || bgcolor=#| || New Caledonia || None || None ||
|-
| Unnamed ||  || bgcolor=#| || bgcolor=#| || bgcolor=#| || New Caledonia || None || None ||
|-
| Unnamed ||  || bgcolor=#| || bgcolor=#| || bgcolor=#| || New Caledonia || None || None ||
|-
| Esther ||  || bgcolor=#| || bgcolor=#| || bgcolor=#| || Papua New Guinea || None || None ||
|-
| Unnamed ||  || bgcolor=#| || bgcolor=#| || bgcolor=#| || None || None || None ||
|-
| Nora ||  || bgcolor=#| || bgcolor=#| || bgcolor=#| || Fiji || Minor || None ||
|-
| Ida ||  || bgcolor=#| || bgcolor=#| || bgcolor=#| || Solomon Islands, VanuatuNew Caledonia ||  ||  ||
|-
| Bebe ||  || bgcolor=#| || bgcolor=#| || bgcolor=#| || Fiji, Kiribati, Tuvalu ||  ||  ||
|-
| Unnamed ||  || bgcolor=#| || bgcolor=#| || bgcolor=#| || New Caledonia ||  ||  ||
|-
| Unnamed ||  || bgcolor=#| || bgcolor=#| || bgcolor=#| || Queensland ||  ||  ||
|-
| Unnamed ||  || bgcolor=#| || bgcolor=#| || bgcolor=#| || None ||  ||  ||
|-
| Claudia ||  || bgcolor=#| || bgcolor=#| || bgcolor=#| || Solomon Islands ||  ||  ||
|-
| Joti ||  || bgcolor=#| || bgcolor=#| || bgcolor=#| || Vanuatu || Minor || None ||
|-
| Unnamed ||  || bgcolor=#| || bgcolor=#| || bgcolor=#| || None ||  ||  ||
|-
| Unnamed ||  || bgcolor=#| || bgcolor=#| || bgcolor=#| || None ||  ||  ||
|-
| Namu ||  || bgcolor=#| ||  bgcolor=#| || bgcolor=#| || Solomon Islands ||  ||  ||
|-
| Blanch(e) ||  || bgcolor=#| || bgcolor=#| || bgcolor=#| || Solomon Islands ||  ||  ||
|-
| Meena ||  || bgcolor=#| || bgcolor=#| || bgcolor=#| || Cape York Peninsula || Minor || None ||
|-
| Ernie ||  || bgcolor=#| || bgcolor=#| || bgcolor=#| || None ||  ||  ||
|-
| Unnamed ||  || bgcolor=#| || bgcolor=#| || bgcolor=#| || Fiji ||  ||  ||
|-
| Lisa ||  || bgcolor=#| || bgcolor=#| || bgcolor=#| || Solomon Islands, Vanuatu ||  ||  ||
|-
| Innis ||  || bgcolor=#| || bgcolor=#| || bgcolor=#| || Solomon Islands, Vanuatu ||  ||  ||
|-
| June ||  || bgcolor=#| || bgcolor=#| || bgcolor=#| || Fiji ||  || None ||
|-
| 37P ||  || bgcolor=#| || bgcolor=#| || bgcolor=#| || Vanuatu ||  ||  ||
|-
| Keli ||  || bgcolor=#| || bgcolor=#| || bgcolor=#| || Tuvalu, Fiji, Samoan islands ||  || None ||
|-
| Lusi ||  || bgcolor=#| || bgcolor=#| || bgcolor=#| || Vanuatu, Fiji ||  ||  ||
|-
| 03P ||  || bgcolor=#| || bgcolor=#| || bgcolor=#| || None ||  ||  ||
|-
| Martin ||  || bgcolor=#| || bgcolor=#| || bgcolor=#| || Cook Islands, French Polynesia ||  ||  ||
|-
| Bart ||  || bgcolor=#| || bgcolor=#| || bgcolor=#| || French Polynesia || Minor ||  ||
|-
| 26F ||  || bgcolor=#| || bgcolor=#| || bgcolor=#| || Queensland, New Zealand || None || None ||
|-
| 20F ||  || bgcolor=#| || bgcolor=#| || bgcolor=#| || Queensland || None || None ||
|-
| 21F ||  || bgcolor=#| || bgcolor=#| || bgcolor=#| || Queensland || None || None ||
|-
| 22F ||  || bgcolor=#| || bgcolor=#| || bgcolor=#| || None || None || None ||
|-
| 23F ||  || bgcolor=#| || bgcolor=#| || bgcolor=#| || None || None || None ||
|-
| 24F ||  || bgcolor=#| || bgcolor=#| || bgcolor=#| || None || None || None ||
|-
| 14F ||  || bgcolor=#| || bgcolor=#| || bgcolor=#| || None || None || None ||
|-
| 15F ||  || bgcolor=#| || bgcolor=#| || bgcolor=#| || None || None || None ||
|-
| 17F ||  || bgcolor=#| || bgcolor=#| || bgcolor=#| || None || None || None ||
|-
| 01F ||  || bgcolor=#| || bgcolor=#| || bgcolor=#| || Vanuatu || None || None ||
|-
| Gina ||  || bgcolor=#| || bgcolor=#| || bgcolor=#| || Solomon Islands || None || None ||
|-
| 01F ||  || bgcolor=#| || bgcolor=#| || bgcolor=#| || Solomon Islands || None || None ||
|-
| 14F ||  || bgcolor=#| || bgcolor=#| || bgcolor=#| || None || None || None ||
|-
| 17F ||  || bgcolor=#| || bgcolor=#| || bgcolor=#| || None || None || None ||
|-
| 18F ||  || bgcolor=#| || bgcolor=#| || bgcolor=#| || None || None || None ||
|-
| Xavier ||  || bgcolor=#| || bgcolor=#| || bgcolor=#| || Solomon Islands, Vanuatu || Extensive || None ||
|-
| 02F ||  || bgcolor=#| || bgcolor=#| || bgcolor=#| || None || None || None ||
|-
| 01F ||  || bgcolor=#| || bgcolor=#| || bgcolor=#| || Solomon Islands || None || None ||
|-
| 17F ||  || bgcolor=#| || bgcolor=#| || bgcolor=#| || None || None || None ||
|-
| 22F ||  || bgcolor=#| || bgcolor=#| || bgcolor=#| || Fiji || None || None ||
|-
| 01F ||  || bgcolor=#| || bgcolor=#| || bgcolor=#| || Solomon Islands || None || None ||
|-
| 02F ||  || bgcolor=#| || bgcolor=#| || bgcolor=#| || Vanuatu || Minor || None ||
|-
| 03F ||  || bgcolor=#| || bgcolor=#| || bgcolor=#| || Solomon Islands || None || None ||
|-
| 04F ||  || bgcolor=#| || bgcolor=#| || bgcolor=#| || Solomon Islands || None || None ||
|-
| Raquel ||  || bgcolor=#| || bgcolor=#| || bgcolor=#| || Solomon Islands || Significant ||  ||
|-
| 01F ||  || bgcolor=#| || bgcolor=#| || bgcolor=#| || Solomon Islands || None || None ||
|-
| 02F ||  || bgcolor=#| || bgcolor=#| || bgcolor=#| || Vanuatu || None || None ||
|-
| Donna ||  || bgcolor=#| || bgcolor=#| || bgcolor=#| || Solomon Islands, VanuatuNew Caledonia, New Zealand || Significant ||  ||
|-
| Ella ||  || bgcolor=#| || bgcolor=#| || bgcolor=#| || Samoan Islands, TongaWallis and Futuna, Fiji || Minor || None ||
|-
| Liua ||  || bgcolor=#| || bgcolor=#| || bgcolor=#| || Solomon Islands || None || 0 ||
|-
| 12F ||  || bgcolor=#| || bgcolor=#| || bgcolor=#| || None || None || 0 ||
|-
| Gina ||  || bgcolor=#| || bgcolor=#| || bgcolor=#| || Vanuatu ||  ||  ||
|}

Records and statistics
According to records compiled by Stephen Sargent Visher and the Vanuatu Meteorology Service, the first tropical cyclone on record to occur outside of the current season was located near Vanuatu and was active during May 17, 1868. However, the official database provided by the International Best Track Archive for Climate Stewardship, which dates back to 1892, shows that the first storm to occur in the basin outside of the current season was in 1912. The database shows that 55 tropical cyclones have existed in the basin during the off-season between May and October, while in addition 36 other systems that are not included in IBTRACS have monitored by the warning centres.

Off-season systems are most likely to occur in May with a total of 43 systems developing or persisting into the month, compared with 20 developing during October. Out of all systems recorded only four systems have developed in either August or September, and were all recorded before the satellite era started during the 1969–70 season. The latest tropical cyclone to exist in the basin on record was Tropical Cyclone Raquel, which was named during June 30, 2015. Raquel was also unofficially considered to be the earliest a tropical cyclone, after it persisted into July 2015 when the tropical cyclone year changed.

The charts below both show during which month a tropical cyclone developed during the off-season. The statistics for April are not complete and only show those systems that formed during the month and either dissipated on April 30, or persisted into May and the off-season. The charts are also split with red showing those systems that developed within the satellite era, while those in red developed, before the satellite era started during the 1969–70 season.

Notes

See also
List of off-season Atlantic hurricanes
List of off-season Australian region tropical cyclones
List of off-season Pacific hurricanes

References

External links

South Pacific cyclones off-season
 List
South Pacific cyclones